Monnina loxensis is a species of plant in the family Polygalaceae. It is endemic to Ecuador.

References

loxensis
Flora of Ecuador
Vulnerable plants
Taxonomy articles created by Polbot